Pomârla is a commune in Botoșani County, Western Moldavia, Romania. It is composed of three villages: Hulubești, Pomârla, Poiana and Racovăț.

Natives
Dimitrie Călugăreanu, physician, naturalist, and physiologist
Andrei Dumitraș, footballer

References

Communes in Botoșani County
Localities in Western Moldavia